Kanagavel Kaaka is a 2010 Indian Tamil-language action film written and directed by Kavin Bala. The film stars Karan and Haripriya in the lead roles, while Kota Srinivasa Rao, Adithya Menon, and Sampath Raj play supporting roles. The music was composed by Vijay Antony with cinematography by Shaji and editing by Suresh Urs. The film released on 21 May 2010.

Plot 
Kanagavel (Karan), works in a court. He comes across various cases, where the rich and influential guilty men escape from the iron-hands of law through money, influence, and power. In disguise, Vel kills them, sending a strong message to everyone who bends the rule of law. In the meantime, a futile attempt by Velu to murder Law Minister Ayyanarappan (Kota Srinivasa Rao) forces cops to investigate the issue. A series of murders poses problems to them even as Deputy Commissioner of Police Karunakaran (Adithya Menon) is deputed to nab the criminal. There is a flashback which reveals Vel's motives. A few years ago, Vel's father Muthu Rathina Sakthivel (Avinash), an honest judge, is forced to see his wife and daughter killed by Ayyanarappan, but he escapes the punishment. Vel manages to get the job of 'dawali' and take revenge on him. The climax of the film concerns whether or not he achieved his mission.

Cast

Soundtrack 
The music was composed by Vijay Antony.

Reception
Behindwoods wrote "Kanagavel Kaakka has got an interesting subject. But, lack of suspense and intelligence in the proceedings are major drawbacks. A tighter and more focused screenplay was definitely called for". Rediff wrote "Pa Raghavan's peppy dialogues have helped Kavin Bala's efforts at presenting a reasonably-paced adventure, despite the predictable scenes. Some originality would have helped, though". Sify wrote "On the whole there is nothing new in story or treatment, at the same time it is timepass entertainer". Indian Express called it "a fairly engaging one".

References

External links
 

2010 films
2010s Tamil-language films
Films scored by Vijay Antony
Indian action films
2010 directorial debut films
2010 action films